Associazione Calcio Jesolo is an Italian association football club, based in Jesolo, Veneto.

Jesolo currently plays in Prima Categoria Veneto group G.

History
The club was founded in 1929 as Gruppo Sportivo Dopolavoro Jesolo, become Associazione Calcio Jesolo on 1945.

In the 1972–73 the club won Coppa Italia Dilettanti, so it played the Barassi Cup in 1973 with Walton & Hersham F.C.

It played in serie D from 1965–66 to 1968–69 and from 1978–79 to 1985–86.

The refoundation

It was refounded on 1997 in Terza Categoria of Venice after the bankruptcy of the old company.

Since the summer 2010 with the transfer of U.S. Città di Jesolo to San Donà di Piave, the club becomes the first and only football team in the city of Jesolo.

Colors and badge
The team's colors are black and blue.

Honours
 Coppa Italia Dilettanti
 Winners: 1972–73

References

Football clubs in Italy
Football clubs in Veneto
Association football clubs established in 1929
1929 establishments in Italy